'Alī ibn Yūsuf al-Qifṭī or Ali Ibn Yusuf the Qifti (of Qift, his home city), he was Jamāl al-Dīn Abū al-Ḥasan 'Alī ibn Yūsuf ibn Ibrāhīm ibn 'Abd al-Wahid al-Shaybānī (ca. 1172–1248); an Egyptian Arab historian, biographer-encyclopedist, patron, and administrator-scholar under the Ayyubid rulers of Aleppo. His biographical dictionary Kitāb Ikhbār al-'Ulamā' bi Akhbār al-Ḥukamā, tr. 'History of Learned Men'; is an important source of Islamic biography. Much of his vast literary output is lost, including his histories of the Seljuks, Buyids and the Maghreb, and biographical dictionaries of philosophers and philologists. See below.

Life
'Alī al-Qifṭī, known as Ibn al-Qifṭī, was a native of Qift, Upper Egypt, the son of al-Qāḍī al-Ashraf, Yūsuf al-Qifṭī (b.548/1153), and the grandson of Ibrāhīm ibn 'Abd al-Wāḥid, al-Qāḍī al-Awḥad in the Ayyūbid court. Alī succeeded his father and grandfather into court administration but displayed scholarly inclinations. When the family left Qift in 1177, following the rising of a Fāṭimid Pretender, his father, Yūsuf, took up official posts in Upper Egypt and 'Alī completed his early education in Cairo.

In 583/1187 Yūsuf al-Qifṭī was appointed deputy to al-Qāḍī al-Fāḍil, chancellor and adviser to Ṣalāh al-Dīn at Jerusalem, and patron and benefactor of Maimonides, Al-Qifṭī spent many years studying and collecting material for his later works. When Ṣalāh al-Dīn died in 598/1201 and his brother, Malik al-'Ādil, usurped his nephew's position to occupy Jerusalem, Ibn al-Qifṭī's father fled to Ḥarran into the service of Ṣalāh al-Dīn's son Ashraf. Ibn al-Qifṭī sought patronage in Aleppo as secretary to the former governor of Jerusalem and Nablus, Fāris al-Din Maimūn al Qaṣrī, the then vizier to the Ayyubid emir Ṣalāh al-Dīn's third son, Malik aẓ-Ẓāhir Ghāzi. He was recognised as an effective administrator of the fiefs and when the vizier died in 610/1214 aẓ-Ẓāhir appointed him khāzin of the Dīwān of Finance, despite his own preference for study. On aẓ-Ẓāhir's death in 613/1216 al-Qifti retired but was re-appointed three years later by aẓ-Ẓāhir's successor. He remained in office until 628/1231. According to his protégé and biographer, Yaqūt, writing before 624/1227 al-Qifti already held the honorific title "al-Qāḍī 'l-Akram al-Wazir" (most noble judge chief minister). After a five-year sabbatical al-Qifṭī took up the office of vizier in 633/1236 and held it up to his death in 646/1248. During that time he was also a member, along with Shams al-Din Lu'lu' al-Amini, of the regency council that governed on behalf of an-Nasir Yusuf.

Throughout his life al-Qifṭī advocated scholarship and sought to pursue a literary career despite heavy constraints of high office. When Yaqūt had fled the Mongol invasion to Aleppo, he had received shelter from al-Qifti, who had assisted him in the compilation of his great geographical and biographical encyclopedia, known as Irshad. Yaqut lists al-Qifṭī's pre-620 works (some were then incomplete). Al-Ṣafadī copied this list in his Wāfī fi 'l-Wafayāt and Al-Kutubī's Fawāt al-Wafayat (1196) borrowed from it, but his copy is corrupted by many errors.

Works
Al-Qifṭī wrote mainly historical works and of 26 recorded titles just two survive:

Extant

Kitāb Ikhbār al-'Ulamā' bi Akhbār al-Ḥukamā; abbrev. Ta'rikh al-Ḥukama, 'The biographies and the books of the great philosophers'; a biographical dictionary of 414 physicians, philosophers and astronomers; the most important source of exact sciences and Hellenistic tradition in Islām and sole literary witness of many accounts by ancient Greek scholars.
Inbā ar-Rawat 'alā 'Anbā an-Nuhat (3 vol.); synopsis (647/1249) by Muḥammad ibn 'Alī az-Zawanī.

Lost
 Precious Pearls of the Account of the Master (Ad-Dur ath-Thamin fi 'Akhbar al-Mutīmīn)
Report of the Muhammad Poets, (Akhbar al-Muhammadin min al-Shuara), (posthumous); only fragments
History of Maḥmūd b. Sübüktigin (Sabuktakin) and His Sons'(wabanīhi, in al-Kubutī wabakīyat)
History of the Seljuks, from the Beginning to the End of the Dynasty (Baqiat Tārīkh as-Siljūqīa)
Apostles of Poets; arranged by al-Aba' up to Muḥammad bin Sa'īd; posthumous work written by al-Hasan ibn al-Haytham; History of the Poets; only poets named Muḥammad extant) (Kitāb al-Muhmidīn min ash-Shu'ra'i; ratibah 'alā al-Ābā' wa balagh bīhī Muḥammad bin Sa'id.) (wa Katab 'an al-Hasan bin al-Haythm)
History of the Mirdasids (Akhbar al-Mirdas)
The Biographies and Books of the Great Philosophers (Akhbar al-Alama bi Akhyar al-Hukama)()
 Account of the Grammarians (Akhbar an-Nahwiyyin); survives only in abstract by Muh. b. Ahmad al-Dhahabi.
Account of the Writers and their Writings (Akhbar al-Musanafin wa ma Sanafuh)
 History of the Yemen (Tarikh al-Yemen)
 Egypt; in six parts ('Akhbār Misr, fi sitta 'Ajza'):: including
 History of Cairo until the reign of Salah al-Din; identical to Comprehensive Tarikh al-Qifti contained in the epitome of Ibn Maktum (d. 749/1348)
History of the Buyids
History of the Maghreb
Correction of Errors by al-Jawhari (Islāh Khilal as-Sahāhi, lil-Jawhrī)
 Nahza al-Khater in Literature (Nahazat al-Khāṭr >> fi-l-Adab); History of Scholarship (the Shaykhs of al-Kindi), a supplement to the Ansab of al-Baladhuri, etc.
Biographies of Ibn Rashiq, Abu Sa'id al-Sirafi

See also
Muslim historiography

References
Citations

Bibliography

External links

English translation of a portion of Al-Qifti's Tarikh al-hukama - dealing with the destruction of the library of Alexandria.

 

1170s births
1248 deaths
12th-century Muslims
13th-century biographers
13th-century Egyptian historians
Egyptian historians of Islam
Egyptian biographers
Egyptian encyclopedists
12th-century Egyptian historians
Encyclopedists of the medieval Islamic world
Year of birth unknown
Year of birth uncertain
Historians from the Ayyubid Sultanate
Viziers of the medieval Islamic world